The pontifical secret or pontifical secrecy or papal secrecy is the code of confidentiality that, in accordance with the Latin canon law of the Catholic Church as modified in 1983, applies in matters that require greater than ordinary confidentiality:

Pontifical secrecy is the subject of the instruction  of 4 February 1974 issued by the Secretariat of State.

Its applicability in cases of accusations and trials involving abuse of minors or vulnerable persons and in cases of possession of child pornography by clerics was removed on 17 December 2019. Its use in such cases had been condemned by German Cardinal Reinhard Marx at the Meeting on the Protection of Minors in the Church held in the Vatican from 21 to 24 February 2019.

Matters covered by pontifical secret
The instruction  lists ten classes of matters covered by the pontifical secret:
 Preparation of papal documents, if pontifical secrecy is expressly demanded
 Information obtained officially by the Secretariat of State in connection with questions requiring pontifical secrecy
 Notifications sent to the Congregation for the Doctrine of the Faith about teachings and publications and the Congregation's examination of them
 Extrajudicial denunciations of crimes against the faith and morals or against the sacrament of Penance, while safeguarding the right of the person denounced to be informed of the denunciation, if his defence against it makes this necessary. The name of the person making the denunciation may be made known to him only if it is judged necessary to have a face-to-face confrontation between denouncer and denounced.
 Reports by papal legates on matters covered by pontifical secrecy.
 Information obtained officially with regard to the naming of cardinals
 Information obtained officially with regard to the naming of bishops and papal legates and the relative inquiries.
 Information obtained officially with regard to the naming of the chief officers of the Roman Curia.
 All matters concerning cipher systems and enciphered messages.
 Any matter that the Pope, a Cardinal in charge of a department of the Roman Curia, or a papal legate considers to be of such importance that it requires the protection of papal secrecy.

Matters excluded from the pontifical secret
The canon law instruction "On the confidentiality of legal proceedings" of 17 December 2019, excluded from the pontifical secret the accusations, trials and decisions in canonical investigations and trials involving:
 violence or abuse of authority in forcing sexual acts, 
 sexual abuse of minors or vulnerable persons, 
 paedophilia involving children under 18 years of age or with incapacitated subjects,
 concealment of those conducts from ecclesiastical or civil inquiries.

According to Archbishop Juan Ignacio Arrieta, Secretary of the Pontifical Council for Legislative Texts, the purpose of the Rescript of 17 December 2019 was to:

On its part, Prof. Giuseppe Dalla Torre, former president of the Vatican City State Tribunal, observed that the lifting of the Pontifical secret was due to the fact that:

According to Archbishop Charles Scicluna, adjunct secretary of the Congregation for the Doctrine of the Faith, the abolition of pontifical secrecy means that:

Sanctions for violation
While violation of pontifical secrecy, if deliberate, is a grave sin, and while an automatic excommunication may sometimes be imposed for violation of secrecy on particular matters, the general rule is only that, if the violation becomes known outside of Confession, a penalty proportionate to the wrongdoing and the damage caused is to be inflicted.

An example of the imposition of automatic excommunication for violation of secrecy was found in the 1962 instruction  (in force until replaced by new norms in 2001), which imposed this penalty on members of a Church tribunal trying a priest accused of making sexual advances to a penitent in connection with the sacrament of Penance, if they violated secrecy about developments in the course of the ecclesiastical trial. A person to whom such advances were made was, on the contrary, subjected to excommunication if that person failed to denounce the priest within at most one month.

Thus the procedures of the Church tribunal were covered by papal secrecy (called at that time secrecy of the Holy Office), but the crime of the priest was not: "These matters are confidential only to the procedures within the Church, but do not preclude in any way for these matters to be brought to civil authorities for proper legal adjudication. The Charter for the Protection of Children and Young People of June, 2002, approved by the Vatican, requires that credible allegations of sexual abuse of children be reported to legal authorities."

See also

Notes

References

Catholic Church legal terminology
Secrecy
Roman Curia